Bajaj Finserv Limited is an Indian non-banking financial services company headquartered in Pune. It is focused on lending, asset management, wealth management and insurance.

History
The financial  services and wind energy businesses were transferred to Bajaj Finserv Limited (BFS) as part of the concluded demerger from Bajaj Auto Limited, approved by the High Court of Judicature at Bombay by its order dated 18 December 2007. It is a financial conglomerate with stakes in the financing sector (Bajaj Finance), the life insurance business (Bajaj Life Insurance), and the general insurance business (Bajaj General Insurance).

Bajaj Holdings and Investments Limited is the parent company which holds 39.29% stake in Bajaj Finserv. The former has been registered as a Non–Banking Financial Company (NBFC) under the Registration No. N–13.01952 dated 29 October 2009 with Reserve Bank of India (RBI).

The company employs over 20,154 employees at 1,409 locations, and is engaged in consumer finance businesses, life insurance, and general insurance. Apart from financial services, it is also active in wind energy generation with an installed capacity of 65.2 MW. In the quarterly results for June 2022, the company's board of directors has approved the sub-division of its equity shares in a ratio of 1:5.

During a block deal in the last week of December 2022, promoter Jamnalal Sons increased its holdings in the company. In the open market, the promoter purchased equity shares worth a total of ₹100.41 crore. However, the other promoter, Rishab Family Trust, was able to sell a portion of the company's shares.

Subsidiaries 

 Bajaj Finance was initially incepted as Bajaj Auto Finance in 1987. Later diversified into business and property financing.
 Bajaj Allianz Life Insurance is a joint venture between Bajaj Finserv and Allianz SE. Being one of the private insurance companies in India, it offers insurance products for financial planning and security. The company received the Insurance Regulatory and Development Authority (IRDA) certificate of Registration on 3 August 2001 to conduct Life insurance business in India.
 Bajaj Allianz General Insurance is a private general insurance company in India. It is another joint venture between Bajaj Finserv Limited and Allianz SE. It is headquartered in Pune with offices in over 200 cities in India and more than 3,500 employees as of 2018.

References

External links
 (Bajaj Finserv Direct Limited)

Bajaj Auto
Bajaj Group
Financial services companies based in Pune
Financial services companies established in 2007
NIFTY 50
Indian companies established in 2007
BSE SENSEX
2007 establishments in Maharashtra
Companies listed on the National Stock Exchange of India
Companies listed on the Bombay Stock Exchange